Canada competed at the 2013 World Aquatics Championships in Barcelona, Spain between 19 July to 4 August 2013.

Medalists

Diving

Canada qualified 7 divers.

Men

Women

High diving

Canada qualified 1 high diver.

Open water swimming

Canada qualified 5 open water swimmers.

Swimming

Canadian swimmers earned qualifying standards in the following events (up to a maximum of 2 swimmers in each event at the A-standard entry time, and 1 at the B-standard):

Men

Women

Synchronized swimming

Canada qualified 12 synchronized swimmers.

* Reserves

Water polo

Men's tournament

Canada qualified a men's team.

Team roster

Justin Boyd
Nicolas Constantin-Bicari
John Conway
Devon Diggle
Luka Gasic
Kevin Graham
Constantin Kudaba
Ivan Marcisin
Jared McElroy
Alel Taschereau
Robin Randall
Scott Robinson
Oliver Vikalo

Group play

Round of 16

Women's tournament

Canada's qualified a women's team.

Team roster

Krystina Alogbo
Sophie Baron La Salle
Joelle Bekhazi
Nicola Colterjohn
Carmen Eggens
Monika Eggens
Katrina Monton
Dominique Perreault
Marina Radu
Michele Relton
Christine Robinson
Stephanie Valin
Emma Wright

Group play

Round of 16

Quarterfinal

5th–8th place semifinal

Seventh place game

References

External links
Official website

Nations at the 2013 World Aquatics Championships
2013
World Aquatics Championships